= List of ambassadors of Turkey to Kosovo =

The list of ambassadors of Turkey to Kosovo provides a chronological record of individuals who have served as the diplomatic representatives of the Republic of Turkey to the Republic of Kosovo.

== List of ambassadors ==
Ambassador	Term start	Term end	Ref.
Muhittin Ahmet Yazal	1 September 1999	19 February 2001	
Mustafa Osman Turan	17 October 2000	15 August 2002	
Hakan Olcay	31 August 2001	16 September 2002	
Metin Kılıç	15 August 2002	17 October 2005	
Volkan Türk Vural	31 October 2005	24 August 2007	
Mustafa Sarnıç	29 August 2007	31 October 2008	
Metin Hüsrev Ünler	20 April 2009	26 December 2010	
Songül Ozan	15 January 2011	17 August 2015	
Kıvılcım Kılıç	18 August 2015	1 February 2019	
Çağrı Sakar	1 February 2019	15 February 2023	
Sabri Tunç Angılı	15 February 2023	Present	
